Potomac station could refer to:

 Potomac Station, Virginia, an inhabited place
 Potomac station (Metroway), a bus rapid transit station in Alexandria, Virginia
 Potomac station (PAAC), a light rail station in Pittsburgh, Pennsylvania